Hamid Sourian Reihanpour (born 24 August 1985) is a retired Iranian wrestler. He is widely regarded as one of the greatest Greco-Roman wrestlers of all time. Sourian is 2012 Summer Olympic games gold medalist and six-time World Champion. He won both the Junior World Championships and Senior World Championships in 2005. He is also 2007 and 2008 asian championships gold medalist.

Summer Olympics 2008
Sourian was a strong favorite to win the gold medal at 55 kg in the 2008 Beijing Olympics, but was upset in the quarterfinals by eventual gold medalist Nazyr Mankiev of Russia. Sourian was defeated in the bronze medal match by South Korea's Park Eun-Chul, Sourian had beaten Park in two different world championship finals prior to this Bronze medal match. In both his losses, he lost on tie-breaker criteria.

Summer Olympics 2012
On 5 August 2012, he won his country's first ever gold medal in Greco-Roman wrestling, defeating Azerbaijan's Rovshan Bayramov in the 55 kg final.

Summer Olympics 2016
After failing to qualify for the World Championship games and Continental Qualifier, on 3 May 2016 Sourian entered the second of the two worldwide qualification tournaments for the 2016 Summer Olympics in Turkey after failing to overcome Ivo Angelov from Bulgaria in Mongolia.

On May 5, Aleksandr Karelin posted a photo of Sourian on his Instagram page, wishing him success by writing: "You are the best and I wish you the best in the last 2016 Olympic Qualification Tournament. Believe you can and you will."

On May 7, Sourian finished first in the tournament and secured his ticket for Rio.

On the 14th of August, he was defeated by Shinobu Ota from Japan in the round of 32. Although leading by 4-0 in the first half of the bout, his energy quickly depleted in the second half and he was defeated by 5-6 in the end. His next match was against Almat Kebispayev from Kazakistan in the repechage round. Again he was comfortably in the lead by 7-0 in the first half and then only needed one point for victory in the second, but his energy levels dropped towards the end and he lost the bout. This was his last appearance in Rio and his tournament was brought to a surprising end.

International competition record

See also
 List of World and Olympic Champions in Greco-Roman wrestling

References

External links

 

1985 births
Living people
People from Ray, Iran
Islamic Azad University, Central Tehran Branch alumni
Iranian male sport wrestlers
Olympic wrestlers of Iran
Wrestlers at the 2008 Summer Olympics
Wrestlers at the 2012 Summer Olympics
Wrestlers at the 2016 Summer Olympics
Olympic gold medalists for Iran
Olympic medalists in wrestling
Medalists at the 2012 Summer Olympics
World Wrestling Champions
Wrestlers at the 2010 Asian Games
Asian Games competitors for Iran
Asian Wrestling Championships medalists
Greco-Roman wrestlers